MSC Armonia is a Lirica-class cruise ship owned and operated by MSC Cruises. Originally built in 2001 for the now defunct Festival Cruises as MS European Vision, she has operated for MSC since 2004. At 58,600 gross tons, she can accommodate 2,065 passengers in 783 cabins and 760 crew members.

History

European Vision 
As European Vision, she was chartered for the 27th G8 summit in Genoa, Italy as a secure location to house world leaders. Terrorism fears were high in advance of the 11 September 2001 attacks and Al Qaeda was believed to be considering Genoa as a target. Although the ship was protected by a phalanx of anti-terrorism units including helicopters and missile launchers, U.S. President George W. Bush stayed instead at a dockside hotel.

Operational career 
MSC Armonia has cruised around the Mediterranean Sea and ports within the Eastern Atlantic. She was homeported in Havana until December 2018, when she re-positioned to Miami to begin offering cruises to Cuba, and later, to the Caribbean. In November 2020, she was originally scheduled to homeport in Tampa, Florida for the first time, sailing to the Caribbean. However, due to the COVID-19 pandemic forcing fleet redeployments, MSC Armonia is scheduled to continue sailing from Miami through 2021.

Incidents

2018 collision 
On 10 April 2018, MSC Armonia struck a dock at the port in Roatán. Damage to the ship was minor and after repairs were made to the ship, Honduran Port State Control authorities cleared the ship to continue her journey to Belize. No injuries to the passengers and crew on board were reported.

COVID-19 pandemic
During the COVID-19 pandemic, the CDC reported, as early as 22 April 2020, that at least one person who tested positive for SARS-CoV-2 was symptomatic while on board.

References

External links

 

Armonia
2000 ships